Martijn Dieleman (born  in Goes) is a former Dutch male volleyball player. He was part of the Netherlands men's national volleyball team. He competed with the national team at the 2000 Summer Olympics in Sydney, Australia, finishing 5th. He played with Remote, Zwolle in 1998.

Now he is a life and spiritual coach and he runs a Youtube channel and his website, www.martijndieleman.com.

See also
 Netherlands at the 2000 Summer Olympics

References

External links
 profile at sports-reference.com

1979 births
Living people
Dutch men's volleyball players
Volleyball players at the 2000 Summer Olympics
Olympic volleyball players of the Netherlands
Sportspeople from Goes